Shekar Basha  :te: శేఖర్ బాషా is an Indian radio jockey on BIG FM 92.7 Hyderabad. He is the only radio jockey in India to have won the Excellence in Radio Award 18 times, the Latest being India radio forum's "RJ of the year 2019", India's most prestigious award for a radio jockey. And as per a survey conducted by The Times of India (TOI) published on 18 May 2018, He is one of the "top 10 Most Desirable Men on Television". And, TOI quotes him as "The original radio guru who won tons of applause for his signature brand of infotainment, Shekar has proved he’s the undisputed king of entertainment with his equally successful stint on TV". As a VJ, he received Best Video Jockey of the year 2016 from Padma Mohana awards held at Ravindra Bharathi, Hyderabad on 23 August 2016.

Career

Early phase (2005–2007) 
Basha started his career as a video jockey in Gemini Music, an Indian Telugu music channel, on 10 April 2005. He hosted more than 3,000 live shows on the same channel, but he received acclaim for his role in Hi Bujji, a kids theme based TV show, and SundayHum-Sandeham, a live comedy show based on Guru-Sishya theme.

Breakthrough 
In November 2006 he joined Red FM 93.5 (then S FM). He hosted "Thellarindoy Mama" (Breakfast Show) and "Guroo Hoja Shuro" (Afternoon Band). The latter won "The Best Program of the Year-2007" Award at India Radio Forum.  He also introduced the phrase "kevvu keka" to the industry. It became so popular that both films and TV programs were titled after it, and lyrics of film's songs (Pawan Kalyan's Gabbar Singh, Allari Naresh's movie titled Kevvu Keka ) and their dialogue.

Success (2007–present) 

In August 2007 Shekar shifted from Red FM 93.5 to Big FM. There he took charge of the show "Big Sandadi" which was until then hosted by a very popular Telugu TV anchor and film actress Jhansi (TV anchor). On 27 May 2008 the same show was named the Best Radio Show of the Year by IRF. Shekar has a habit of saying "Happy mornings" instead of "Good morning", which caught on quickly with the listeners. As a result, in 2009 the program was renamed as "Happy Mornings". After the formation of the state of Telangana in 2015, the same show "Happy mornings" was renamed as "Sallaam Telangana" reflecting the pride of the state, and the show was awarded the "best breakfast show (Telugu) 2017". In addition to radio and video jockeying, Shekar also produced award-winning promos and Humor capsule sparklers which include the radio humor capsules "Kotigadu & Raogaru", BigBaba, Sangeetham Mastar, Google Gurooji, Anandam Paramaanandam.

Awards and Records 
Shekar has the record of winning the highest number of India Radio Forum awards with a total of 18 awards from 2007 to 2019.

His other awards include:

 Best Video Jockey - 2016 for his show "F-club" in Gemini Music.
 Santhosham Cine Magazine's "Best Radio Jockey for 2014".
 Young Communicator Award for 2010 from International School of Business Management.
He was trained at MICA (institute) i.e., Mudra Institute of Communications, Ahmadabad in radio jockeying.

Marathons 
As of August 2018 Shekar has hosted Four marathon radio jockeying feats:

 92.7 hrs non-stop, the first stunt of its kind in Telugu radio, in September 2007, which created huge buzz in the city and helped radio as a whole to grow in Hyderabad.
 100 hours on-wheels, from 12 to 16 August 2008, live on-air from a mobile studio in an attempt to achieve the feat of non-stop radio jockeying, towards peace in the city and with a purpose to highlight the importance of all to stay together and support each other in times of high alert where society is being challenged constantly by people wanting to wreak havoc.
 106 hrs on-wheels, from 7am on 26 January 2016 to 5pm on 30 January 2016, with a purpose to highlight the importance of using mobile Internet.
72 hrs non-stop Rjing from 13 August 2018 7am to 16 August 2018 7am to raise awareness on the effects of using disposable plastic products.

Movie debut 
Shekar made his debut as an actor with the movie "Welcome Obama", directed by veteran director Singeetam Srinivasa Rao. He also directed the movie "Vethika nenu naa ishtamga". He had also acted as a director in the movie Panchamukhi directed by Challa Bhanu Kiran, which was released in 2014.

Filmography
Welcome Obama (2013) as Subramanyam (son-in-law & purohit)
Vethika Nenu Naa Ishtamga (2014) as Basha bhai (Don)
Pancha Mukhi (2014) as Aspiring Director  
Naa... Nuvve (2018) as RJ

References

External links 

Indian radio presenters
Indian television presenters
Male actors in Telugu cinema
Indian male film actors
21st-century Indian male actors
Telugu film directors
Male actors from Hyderabad, India
Living people
Year of birth missing (living people)